The Libyan Volleyball League is the highest division of the Libyan volleyball league pyramid, organized by Libyan Volleyball Federation. The league began in 1966.

Winners
The most successful Libyan clubs are Alahly Benghazi which won 11 titles, and Asswehly won 7 titles.

Volleyball competitions in Libya